Amy J. Roeder is an American politician, actress, and academic serving as a member of the Maine House of Representatives from the 125th district. Elected in November 2020, she assumed office on December 2, 2020.

Early life and education 
Roeder was born in Minneapolis, Minnesota and raised in New London, Minnesota. She earned a Bachelor of Fine Arts degree in theatre from the University of Evansville and a Master of Fine Arts in theatre from the University of Georgia. She is studying toward a Master of Business Administration at the University of Maine where she currently serves as  an adjunct professor.

Career 
Roeder is a member of the Actors' Equity Association and SAG-AFTRA. From 1998 to 2002, she was an actor, writer, and instructor at Improv Asylum. In 2003 and 2004, she was a member of Gotham City Improv. In 2013 and 2014, she was an instructor at the Second City Training Center. From 2014 to 2018, was the director of education at the Penobscot Theatre Company. In 2018 and 2019, she was the executive director of the Criterion Theatre. Roeder was elected to the Maine House of Representatives in November 2020 and assumed office on December 2, 2020.

Personal life 
Roeder has two adopted sons and lives Bangor, Maine.

Filmography

Film

Television

References 

Year of birth missing (living people)
Living people
American actresses
Actresses from Minneapolis
Actresses from Maine
University of Evansville alumni
University of Georgia alumni
University of Maine faculty
Democratic Party members of the Maine House of Representatives
Women state legislators in Maine
Politicians from Bangor, Maine